Hordeum pubiflorum, also known as Antarctic barley, is a perennial that is native to western and southern South America.

Genetics 
Together with Hordeum vulgare, Hordeum pubiflorum is the only species from the genus Hordeum with a genome published on NCBI.

References

pubiflorum
Taxa named by William Jackson Hooker